Capsule Monsters may refer to:

 In the Yu-Gi-Oh! franchise:
 Capsule Monster Chess  or CapMon, a fictional board game that Mokuba Kaiba plays and forces Yugi Mutou to play twice
 Yu-Gi-Oh!! Capsule Monsters, a twelve-episode mini-series in the Yu-Gi-Oh!! franchise produced by 4Kids Entertainment
 Capsule Monsters, a power used by the titular character in Ultra Seven
 Pokémon Red and Blue, whose working title was Capsule Monsters in 1990